Pino del Oro, formerly known as Pino, is a Spanish municipality in the province of Zamora, Castile and León. 
It has a population of 203 (2006) and an area of 30 km².

A bridge links Pino del Oro and Villadepera.

References

This article contains information from the Spanish Wikipedia article Pino de Oro, accessed on January 7, 2008.

Municipalities of the Province of Zamora